This is a list of Academy Award winners and nominees who are from Asia, i.e., who are nationals of a country situated in Asia (including people with dual citizenship). Best International Feature Film (Best Foreign Language Film) here includes films submitted by Asian countries and films in Asian languages, in addition to films with Asian directors. This list is updated as of the 95th Academy Awards.

This list does not consider ethnicity and includes Academy Award winners who do not claim Asian ancestry or ethnicity.

Best Picture

Best Actor

Best Actress

Best Supporting Actor

Best Supporting Actress

Best Director

Best Original Screenplay

Best Adapted Screenplay

Best Cinematography

Best Film Editing

Best Production Design

Best Costume Design

Best Makeup and Hairstyling

Best Original Score

Best Original Song

Best Sound
Prior to the 93rd Academy Awards, the Best Sound Mixing and Best Sound Editing were separate categories.

Best Visual Effects

Best Animated Feature

Best Documentary Feature

Best Documentary Short Subject

Best Animated Short Film

Best Live Action Short Film

Best International Feature Film

Honorary Awards

See also
List of Asian Golden Globe winners and nominees
List of Asian Tony Award winners and nominees

Notes

References

Lists of Academy Award winners by ethnicity
Asian-American cinema
Academy
Lists of Asian people